Moodswings in This Order is the debut extended play of Australian singer DPR Ian. It was released on March 12, 2021 through Dream Perfect Regime. It was nominated for R&B Album of the Year at the Korean Hip-hop Awards and peaked at number 40 on the Circle Album Chart.

Background 
In an interview with Billboard, DPR Ian explained the inspiration behind the EP.
"Overall, I wanted to portray a character dealing with various mental disorders which may be deemed negative or dark in a realistic sense but at the same time can also be seen as superpowers in a different light. It’s also a reflection of a lot of who I am as a person — being someone that deals with such ‘mental disorders,’ I wanted to remove that stigma and just put an artistic twist to it, because at the end of the day it’s really all about expression for me."

Music and lyrics 
According to Asian Junkie, "DPR Ian takes the listener on his journey through the darkness, despair, loneliness, regrets, fears, and eventually acceptance of who he is now." "So Beautiful" is a "combination of R&B, jazz, and an empty chorus which is somehow able to blend with Ian’s chilling vocals." “No Blueberries” expresses "the facade we give to our anxieties and obsessions through jazzy piano riffs and soft percussion that contrast with the darkness of the lyrics."

Critical reception 
Sofiana Ramli of NME rated the EP 4 out of 5 stars. According to her, it is a "well thought out concept that isn’t too overly ambitious." She concluded that "DPR Ian is carving out a space for himself in the R&B world, and the mark that he’s about to leave on the scene won’t make him go unnoticed."

Year-end lists

Awards and nominations

Track listing

Charts

References 

2021 debut EPs
Alternative R&B albums
Electronica EPs
Pop music EPs